Grave Creek is a tributary, about  long, of the Rogue River in southwestern Oregon in the United States.

Course
The creek begins near Cedar Springs Mountain just north of the Douglas County – Jackson County border and flows generally southwest through Jackson County and Josephine County to its confluence with the Rogue. It passes through the communities of Placer, Sunny Valley, and Leland.

Named tributaries from source to mouth are Panther, Swamp, Last Chance, Big Boulder, Little Boulder, Slate, and Baker, Boulder, and Clark creeks followed by Eastman and Quartz Mill gulches. Then comes Tom East Creek followed by Benjamin Gulch, Shanks Creek, Schoolhouse Gulch, and Salmon Creek.

Further downstream are Rat Creek, Mackin Gulch, and Dog Creek, then Flume, Brimstone, and Brushy gulches. Another Tom East Creek is next, followed by Wolf, Butte, Panther, Reservoir, Fall, Poorman, and McNabe creeks. The final three tributaries are McNair, Rock, and Reuben creeks.

Watershed
Federal and non-federal lands are intermingled in a checkerboard pattern. Drought is common in summer.

Recreation
Hiking trails and river runs converge at the confluence of Grave Creek and the Rogue River. The run, rated class 3 on the International Scale of River Difficulty, has "short twisting blind drops on the section not visible from the road" and possible hazards that include low-hanging footbridges as well as brush along the stream banks. A handy stopping place for this run is the boat ramp near the Grave Creek Bridge over the Rogue River, which is the intersection of at Galice Road and Lower Graves Creek Road. (This is not the same bridge as the covered bridge, the Grave Creek Bridge, further upstream in Sunny Valley.)

The boat ramp is also popular with rafters and kayakers running the  "wild" stretch of the Wild and Scenic lower Rogue, which begins at the mouth of Grave Creek. It is "one of the best-known whitewater runs in the United States." Parallel to the wild stretch of the river, the Lower Rogue River Trail winds through the Wild Rogue Wilderness between the mouth of Grave Creek and Illahe.

See also
List of rivers of Oregon

References

Works cited
Giordano, Pete (2004). Soggy Sneakers: A Paddler's Guide to Oregon's Rivers, fourth edition. Seattle: The Mountaineers Books. .
Sullivan, William L. (2002). Exploring Oregon's Wild Areas, third edition. Seattle: The Mountaineers Press. .

Rivers of Oregon
Rivers of Jackson County, Oregon
Rivers of Douglas County, Oregon
Rivers of Josephine County, Oregon